Nemanja Todorović (born 23 April 1991) is a Serbian professional basketball player for Borac Čačak of the Basketball League of Serbia.

Professional career
Todorović began his professional career in hometown club Borac Čačak where he played from 2010 until 2013. He then signed with Niš-based club Konstantin. The 2014–15 season he played with Metalac Valjevo. He averaged 5.6 points and 1.8 rebounds in 23 games of the ABA League.

On September 12, 2015, he signed a two-year deal with the Bosnian team Igokea. He debuted for the team in 67–56 loss to Cedevita Zagreb in Round 1 of the ABA League; he contributed with 12 points and 4 rebounds. On December 9, 2015, he left Igokea for his former club Metalac Valjevo, after appearing in 12 games of the ABA League, averaging 5.6 points and 2.8 rebounds. In July 2022, he signed a two-year contract extension with Borac.

References

External links
 Nemanja Todorović at aba-liga.com
 Nemanja Todorović at eurobasket.com

Living people
1991 births
ABA League players
Basketball League of Serbia players
KK Borac Čačak players
KK Igokea players
KK Lovćen players
KK Metalac Valjevo players
KK Mladost Čačak players
Serbian expatriate basketball people in Bosnia and Herzegovina
Serbian expatriate basketball people in Montenegro
Serbian men's basketball players
Power forwards (basketball)